Ocean View Hill is a mountain in Barnstable County, Massachusetts. Snake Hills is located northeast of Ocean View Hill. Ocean View Hill is the site of the Cape Cod National Seashore Visitors Center.

References

Mountains of Massachusetts
Mountains of Barnstable County, Massachusetts